New Mecklenburg may refer to:
 Gomersal, South Australia, village in the Barossa Valley renamed in 1918
 Marysville, California, county seat of Yuba County
 New Ireland (island), large island in the state of Papua New Guinea, known as Neu Mecklenburg while under German colonial control from 1885 to 1914
 New Ireland Province, administrative division of Papua New Guinea
 Westgarthtown, Victoria was known as Neu Mecklenburg from establishment around 1850 until World War I when it was absorbed into Thomastown